Homoty  (Homoty) is a village in the administrative district of Gmina Mielnik, within Siemiatycze County, Podlaskie Voivodeship, in north-eastern Poland, close to the border with Belarus.

According to the 1921 census, the village was inhabited by 42 people, among whom 12 were Roman Catholic, 28 Orthodox, and 5 Mosaic. At the same time, all inhabitants declared Polish nationality. There were 92 residential buildings in the village.

References

Homoty